Heidi Sevdal (born 6 March 1989) is a Faroese football forward who currently plays for NSÍ, after representing various other teams in the Faroese 1. deild kvinnur. Since 2006, she has represented the Faroe Islands women's national football team at senior international level.

Club career
Sevdal spent time at the Danish Elitedivisionen club IK Skovbakken in 2006.

In November 2013 Sevdal was named the Faroese women's footballer of the Year after scoring 30 goals for HB Tórshavn. In 2015, she was named player of the year once again. In 2017, along with Adeshina Lawal, she was rewarded for finishing as top scorer and chosen striker of the year in Faroese football.

International career

Sevdal's first appearances for the senior Faroe Islands women's national football team came in November 2006, at the UEFA Women's Euro 2009 qualifying series. At a preliminary round mini-tournament held in Strumica, Macedonia, Malena Josephsen's injury time goal in the Faroe Islands' first match was not enough, as they lost 2–1 to Wales. The team was eliminated after another defeat, 1–0 to Kazakhstan. In the final match the Faroe Islands beat hosts Macedonia 7–0. Sevdal started the first two matches and came on a substitute in the third.

In September 2013, with the Faroe Islands seven goals down to Scotland in a 2015 Women's World Cup qualifier at Tórsvøllur, Sevdal scored two late consolation goals.

International goals
Scores and results list Faroe Islands' goal tally first.

References

External links

 Heidi Sevdal at Faroesoccer.com
 Heidi Sevdal at UEFA.com
 Heidi Sevdal at Kvinnufotbolt.com

1989 births
Living people
People from Runavík
Faroese women's footballers
Faroe Islands women's international footballers
Women's association football forwards